Cristóbal de León (died 1729) was a Spanish painter, active near Seville. He was a pupil of  Juan Valdes Leal. He painted eighteen monastic portraits, and some for the church of San Felipe Neri in Seville. He died at Seville. He is presumed to be the brother of  the painter Felipe de León.

References

1729 deaths
18th-century Spanish painters
18th-century Spanish male artists
Spanish male painters
Painters from Seville
Spanish Baroque painters
Year of birth unknown